Count Your Lucky Stars is a 2020 mainland Chinese television series starring Shen Yue and Jerry Yan. It airs on the video platform Youku and Mango TV between August 3, 2020 and September 3, 2020.

Synopsis
Lu Xingcheng (Jerry Yan) is the editor-in-chief of a well-known magazine. Despite being known for being arrogant, Lu Xingcheng was already considered an expert in the world of fashion. Apart from that, he is also a very lucky man and is used to having everything he wants.

Meanwhile, Tong Xiaoyou (Shen Yue)  is a less famous fashion designer and often experiences bad luck. Until one day, their fate was swapped in an instant because of an accidental kiss. Lu Xingcheng lost it all, whereas Tong Xiaoyou suddenly became famous.

Cast

Main 
 Shen Yue as Tong Xiaoyou 
 Jerry Yan as Lu Xingcheng

Supporting
Jackie Li as Song Ruru 
Miles Wei as Lu Yanzhi
Shen Yao as Wen Xi
Wang Sen as Mu Yang
Li Yu Yang as Jiang Yan
Yu Si Lu as Sarah Lin
Eddie Cheung as Lu Ren
Lily Tien as Cheng Pei Yu (Yan Zhi's mother)
Kathy Chow as Ye Mang

References

IMDb

Chinese web series
Chinese romantic comedy television series
2020 Chinese television series debuts
2020 Chinese television series endings
Chinese-language television shows
Youku original programming
Mango TV original programming